Traffic.com, also known as Navteq Traffic, Traffic Pulse and Mobility Technologies, was a provider of traffic information via a number of media, including the Internet, cell phones, radio, satellite radio and television, in the United States from 2000 to 2013.

Its main competitors in the information service and broadcast industries were Westwood One and Clear Channel Communications (the latter of which was a former client of Westwood).

The company was founded in 1998 as Argus Information Systems.

On November 6, 2006, Navteq announced it had agreed to purchase Traffic.com, officially closing the deal on Wednesday, March 7, 2007.

Nokia acquired Navteq for $8.1 billion on July 10, 2008.

XM Satellite Radio was the main clients of Traffic Pulse, and its media partners included Accuweather and The Weather Channel. In addition, it had established partnerships with many of the transportation agencies in each state serviced.

The company was headquartered in Malvern, Pennsylvania, just outside Philadelphia until 2010 when it was moved to Nokia's headquarters in Chicago shortly after their acquisition of Navteq.

In 2012, Nokia announced that it would cut 10,000 jobs, which included the closing of their traffic gathering offices in many major cities across the United States. After which, the company disseminated traffic information to end-users around the United States solely from their operations headquarters in Chicago.

In 2013, Nokia sold the Traffic.com URL address and adopted Here.com to pair with their new mapping division's identity, Here. The website functions in the same fashion as Traffic.com did, providing traffic information over maps of major cities.

Impact in Chicago
Since Traffic.com was wholly owned by Chicago-based Navteq (now Nokia, a Finnish company), a showcase studio and operations on numerous radio and televisions stations are present. Among the major TV clients are WBBM, WMAQ, WLS, WGN and local cable news outlet CLTV.

Cities served
In 2008, Traffic.com served clients in the following United States metropolitan areas and their respective suburban regions:

Atlanta, Georgia
Albany, New York
Austin, Texas
Baltimore, Maryland
Birmingham, Alabama
Boston, Massachusetts
Charlotte, North Carolina
Chicago, Illinois
Cincinnati, Ohio
Cleveland, Ohio
Columbus, Ohio
Dallas, Texas
Denver, Colorado
Detroit, Michigan
Fort Worth, Texas
Greensboro, North Carolina
Hartford, Connecticut
Houston, Texas
Indianapolis, Indiana
Jacksonville, Florida
Kansas City, Missouri
Las Vegas, Nevada
Los Angeles, California
Louisville, Kentucky
Miami, Florida
Milwaukee, Wisconsin
Minneapolis, Minnesota
Nashville, Tennessee
New Orleans, Louisiana
New York City, New York
Norfolk, Virginia
Oklahoma City, Oklahoma
Orlando, Florida
Philadelphia, Pennsylvania
Phoenix, Arizona
Pittsburgh, Pennsylvania
Portland, Oregon
Providence, Rhode Island
Raleigh-Durham, North Carolina
Richmond, Virginia
Sacramento, California
Salt Lake City, Utah
San Antonio, Texas
San Diego, California
San Francisco, California
Seattle, Washington
St. Louis, Missouri
Tampa, Florida
Tucson, Arizona
Tulsa, Oklahoma
Washington, D.C.

References

External links
Nokia Corporate website
HERE

Road transportation in the United States
Companies based in Chester County, Pennsylvania
Online companies of the United States
Internet properties established in 1998
2007 mergers and acquisitions